is a Japanese footballer. She plays for JEF United Chiba Ladies in the Japanese WE League and Japan national team.

National team career 
On 24 June 2022, Chiba debuted for Japan national team against Serbia.

National team statistics

International goals

References

External links 
 
 

1999 births
Living people
Association football people from Fukushima Prefecture
Japanese women's footballers
Japan women's international footballers
JEF United Chiba Ladies players
Women's association football forwards